Rakovski Nunatak (Rakovski Nunatak \ra-'kov-ski 'nu-na-tak\) is a rocky peak of elevation 430 m in Vidin Heights on Varna Peninsula, Livingston Island in the South Shetland Islands, Antarctica.  Surmounting Rose Valley Glacier to the north.

The peak is named after Georgi S. Rakovski (1821–1867), writer and leader of the Bulgarian liberation movement.

Location

Maps
 L.L. Ivanov et al. Antarctica: Livingston Island and Greenwich Island, South Shetland Islands. Scale 1:100000 topographic map. Sofia: Antarctic Place-names Commission of Bulgaria, 2005.
 L.L. Ivanov. Antarctica: Livingston Island and Greenwich, Robert, Snow and Smith Islands. Scale 1:120000 topographic map.  Troyan: Manfred Wörner Foundation, 2009.

References
 Rakovski Nunatak. SCAR Composite Antarctic Gazetteer.
 Bulgarian Antarctic Gazetteer. Antarctic Place-names Commission. (details in Bulgarian, basic data in English)

External links
 Rakovski Nunatak. Copernix satellite image

Nunataks of Livingston Island